For the comic actor of the silent film era see Chai Hong (actor)

Chai Hong (born 9 August 1999) is a Chinese freestyle skier. She competed in the 2018 Winter Olympics in the women's halfpipe.

References

1999 births
Living people
Freestyle skiers at the 2018 Winter Olympics
Chinese female freestyle skiers
Olympic freestyle skiers of China